Livermore Valley Charter Preparatory (LVCP) was a California Public Charter High School located at 3090 Independence Dr. in Livermore, California. Established in 2010, the school was authorized by the Livermore Valley Joint Unified School District (LVJUSD).  This school is now defunct as a result of the bankruptcy of  its parent charter management operator Tri-Valley Learning Corporation (TVLC) resulting after the completion of an AB139 Extraordinary Audit ordered by Alameda County Office of Education (ACOE) and performed by FCMAT.   Apparent conflicts of interest and fiscal problems were identified along with the default of $57M of loans.

High schools in Alameda County, California
Livermore, California
Educational institutions established in 2010
Charter high schools in California
2010 establishments in California